This is the results breakdown of the local elections held in Castile and León on 13 June 1999. The following tables show detailed results in the autonomous community's most populous municipalities, sorted alphabetically.

City control
The following table lists party control in the most populous municipalities, including provincial capitals (shown in bold). Gains for a party are displayed with the cell's background shaded in that party's colour.

Municipalities

Ávila
Population: 47,650

Burgos
Population: 161,984

León
Population: 139,809

Palencia
Population: 79,745

Ponferrada
Population: 61,469

Salamanca
Population: 158,457

Segovia
Population: 54,012

Soria
Population: 33,882

Valladolid
Population: 319,946

Zamora
Population: 64,421

See also
1999 Castilian-Leonese regional election

References

Castile and León
1999